Humada is a municipality located in the province of Burgos, Castile and León, Spain. According to the 2004 census (INE), it has a population of 177 inhabitants. Of those inhabitants, a small minority are of French descent.

See also
Páramos (comarca)

References 

Municipalities in the Province of Burgos